Frederiksværk-Vinderød Parish is a parish in the Diocese of Helsingør in Halsnæs Municipality, Denmark. The parish was formed on 1 July 2014 by a merger of Frederiksværk Parish and Vinderød Parish. The parish contains the town of Frederiksværk.

References 

Halsnæs Municipality
Parishes of Denmark